DiBernardo or Di Bernardo is a surname. Notable people with the surname include:

Niccolò di Bernardo dei Machiavelli (1469-1527), Italian diplomat, politician, historian, philosopher, humanist and poet 
Francesco di Bernardo Corteccia (1502-1571), Italian composer, organist, and teacher of the Renaissance
Francesco di Bernardo de' Vecchi Da Santacroce (1507-1545), Italian painter, active mainly in Bergamo and Venice
Giovanni di Bernardo Rucellai (1475-1525), Italian humanist, poet, dramatist and man of letters in Renaissance Florence
Giuliano Di Bernardo (born 1939), Italian academic, philosopher and Grand Master of GOI (1990-93)

Alberto Di Bernardo (born 1980), an Italian/Argentine rugby union player
Angelo DiBernardo (born 1956), North American Soccer League and Major Indoor Soccer League player
Federico Santiago Garcia Di Bernardo (born 1984), an Argentine footballer
Mauro Di Bernardo (born 1956), Italian Olympic volleyball player
Paul DiBernardo, former American Indoor Soccer Association player
Rick DiBernardo (born 1964), former National Football League player
Robert DiBernardo (1937–1986), former caporegime
Vanessa DiBernardo (born 1992), an American soccer player

See also 
 Bernardini